Pinktoe may refer to one of the following spiders of genus Avicularia
Antilles pinktoe
Goliath pinktoe
Peruvian pinktoe
Common pinktoe
Yellow-banded pinktoe